The Independent Voice of the Acehnese Party (SIRA) is a regional political party in Indonesia. The party's initials SIRA originally stood for the Information Center for a Referendum on Aceh (Sentral Informasi Referendum Aceh), which was established in 1999, but the organization assumed its current name for the 2009 elections. The party's first chairman was the then deputy governor of Aceh.

It contested the 2009 elections in the province of Aceh, where it was seen as the main challenger for the Aceh Party. However, the party won only 38,157 votes, or 1.78% of the Aceh turnout. It failed to qualify for the 2014 elections. In the 2019 elections, it qualified and won a single seat in the Aceh provincial legislature.

References

Political parties in Indonesia